CAPMAP is an experiment at Princeton University to measure the polarization of the Cosmic microwave background.

See also
Cosmic microwave background experiments
Observational cosmology

References

External links
CAPMAP Homepage

Cosmic microwave background experiments